Zapolje Запоље is a village in the municipality of Bratunac, Republika Srpska, Bosnia and Herzegovina.

References

Villages in Republika Srpska
Populated places in Bratunac